Senator Larson may refer to:

Anton Larson (1873–1965), North Dakota State Senate
Cal Larson (born 1930), Minnesota State Senate
Chris Larson (born 1980), Wisconsin State Senate
Chuck Larson (born 1968), Iowa State Senate
Dan Larson (politician) (born 1965), Minnesota State Senate
Diane Larson (fl. 2010s), North Dakota State Senate
John B. Larson (born 1948), Connecticut State Senate
Lane Larson (born 1957), Montana State Senate
Morgan Foster Larson (1882–1961), New Jersey State Senate
Richard R. Larson (Wyoming politician) (born 1928), Wyoming State Senate
Tim Larson (born 1958), Connecticut State Senate
Tyson Larson (born 1986), Nebraska State Senate

See also
Senator Larsen (disambiguation)
Senator Lawson (disambiguation)